YooHoo & Friends is a South Korean animated children's television series produced by Aurora World. The series is based on the toyline of the same name. The series focuses on a group of animals that accidentally get sent to Earth, and must find the missing magical seeds of the Tree of Life to get back to their home.

The series initially debuted on KBS2 on July 2, 2009 for one season. Two more seasons of the show would then air, starting from October 21, 2013 to April 9, 2015 on KBS1. The show was not renewed for a fourth season.

In 2012, an official English gag dub of the same name based on the first season of the series was released (while Aurora World released an official English dub that was actually faithful to its original source material over on Amazon Prime Video in 2011), created by David Feiss and produced by Toonzone Studios. It was made for western audiences to relate to the series more, but it didn't do well and it never got a second season.

In 2019, a Netflix series based on the franchise, YooHoo to the Rescue, was released.

Plot

Season 1
Season 1 features a story about a group of animals, mostly based on endangered species, who grow the Tree of Life in their habitat Yootopia. They are at risk of extinction because of worsening environmental conditions, but when all the seeds are accidentally blown away to Earth, the group accidentally gets sent down as well. Now being separated from their home, YooHoo and his friends go on adventures to find the missing magical seeds of the Tree of Life, avoiding danger and receiving help from new friends made along their journey as they retrieve each green seed one by one.

Season 2
After reclaiming all of the green seeds and returning to Yootopia, YooHoo and his friends live peacefully until two mysterious people, Oops and Koops, who are crocodile hunters working for their corrupt leader Big Boss, arrive at YooHoo's world to capture him and his friends and sell them to the black market. YooHoo and his friends team up to foil their plans, as well as save Yootopia.

Episodes

Characters
There are 5 main characters in the series: YooHoo, Pammee, Roodee, Chewoo, and Lemmee.

YooHoo (voiced by Jeon Suk-gyeong) is a cream and grey bushbaby with blue eyes and a blue and grey striped tail. He is the main protagonist of the series; he is usually an excellent leader, being the maturest and nicest to everyone of his friends and keeps the team together. His goal is to save Yootopia and find all of the green seed. His catchphrase is "YooHoo!" As of Season 2, he now carries a small brown bag at important situations.
Pammee (voiced by Yu Ji-won) is a pink and white fennec fox with pink eyes, and a pink and white striped tail. She is described as a princess due to her shy and girly nature, constantly finding random things romantic. She is also very optimistic, usually is the voice of reason to the entire group. Pammee can hear things that her friends can't due to her huge ears, and she is able to converse with the nature. As of Season 2, she now officially wears a pink bow at the right side of her head.
Roodee (voiced by Um Sang-hyun) is a yellow and brown Capuchin Monkey with yellow eyes and an orange and brown striped tail, described as the inventor of the group. He is the smartest of the team, able to construct complex inventions from twigs and leaves and usually reads his guidebook for clues. He holds a persistent antagonism with Lemmee and consistently argues with him. As of Season 2, he is now seen wearing glasses, and if they're removed, he turns into a monster.
Chewoo (voiced by Han Shin-jeong) is a red squirrel with white stripes and pink eyes. She is described as the cheerleader, and keeping to her role, she is immature, hyperactive, and always cheerful. Her childishness constantly gets her into trouble, but sometimes she never thinks twice about her actions; more often than not she helps the team accomplish their task. She is usually the cause of the events of the first season and the reason why all the Green Seeds are scattered around the world. As of Season 2, she is now shown wearing a green hat.
Lemmee (voiced by Song Jeong-hui in Season 1 and Lee Won-chan in Season 2) is a grey and white ring-tailed lemur with yellow eyes, black eye markings, and a grey and white striped tail. He is described as a sourpuss, and is in general the outcast of the group. Unsurprisingly he is narcissistic, selfish and sadistic, sometimes often argues with Roodee and later, with YooHoo. However, despite being grumpy, he sometimes displays his nice side to his friends, often giving them some good advice at some situations. Has a crush on Pammee, usually hiding this in front of his friends. As of Season 2, he wears a red bowtie.
Big Boss (voiced by Kim Doo-hee) is the main antagonist of the series; he first appeared on Season 2.
Oops & Koops (voiced by Lee Won-chan as Oops and Kim Doo-hee as Koops) are the evil crocodiles. They first appeared on Season 2 and they are owners and followers of Big Boss. They usually put "Oop" (as Oops) or "Koop" (as Koops) at the end of the quote.

Production
YooHoo & Friends was developed in 2007, and was created to teach children about the protection and preservation of the environment. Season 1 of the series was animated by nSac Entertainment, and Studio Vandal and MICO Studio animated Season 2. The series lasted for three seasons and 65 episodes, and officially ended in 2015. Lawless Entertainment now currently owns the license for the series' distribution in North America.

Broadcast
YooHoo & Friends debuted in South Korea on KBS2, and later on KBS1 from July 2, 2009 to April 11, 2015.

In the US, the first two seasons of the series was made available on Netflix on September 1, 2017. They were later removed on September 1, 2019. The first two seasons are also available on Amazon, but four episodes are missing from Season 2. It is also available to watch on Tubi for free in the US.

References

External links

 
  on KBS2
 

2000s South Korean animated television series
South Korean children's animated adventure television series
South Korean children's animated comedy television series
Flash television shows
Animated preschool education television series
2000s preschool education television series
Korean Broadcasting System original programming
Animated television series about animals
Anime-influenced Western animated television series